Jointness is a term (R. Solan 1991) in psychoanalysis and psychodynamic theory, describing a new look at normal object relation that takes place from the beginning of life. Till nowadays symbiosis (propounded by Margaret Mahler 1968, 1975) is the common term for a normal object relation, while Ronnie Solan emphasizes that symbiosis represents impairment in object relation.

Jointness is defined as a dynamic process representing an emotional system for attachment and for communication between separate individuals who jointly approach each other in a third, joint, virtual space. Jointness represents an encounter between mother and infant, psychotherapist and patient, or any partners experiencing simultaneously mutual intimacy, while concomitantly safeguarding separateness.

The newborn, very early in life, perceives the other, even his mother, as a "not-I" (it indicates a psychic process to safeguard one's own self), and is attached to the "not-I mother" by an intimate acquaintance with her through his/her senses. When both, mother and baby, devote themselves to intimacy, that temporarily blurs the boundaries between them, separateness can be safeguarded. As a result, baby might gradually develop his/her own boundaries and acknowledge those of his or her object and might invest their own innate abilities to participate in human interactions and enjoy relationships ("motivational systems," Emde, 1988).

The development of this basic process of jointness between baby and mother depends on mother's capacity to tolerate separateness. It is the mother who imprints the quality and the intensity of the rapprochement-separation balancing process in their relationship, while both of them are fully invested in each other.

The unique jointness and the unique communication, in a unique psychic virtual space are created by the sharing of interests (emotional or cognitive), and by the mutual investment of partners in a joint phenomenon, object, or idea, meaningful to both. All vital human communication represents both the separateness of the two (or more) individuals and their joining in a third virtual space. Thus, "jointness" elicits the triadic (triangulation) object relations (mother's space – "virtual transitional space" – baby's space).

In this type of transitional space baby and mother, lovers, or partners of a common task, are jointly determine the extent of rapprochement between themselves, the extent of safeguarding separateness and also the moment to separate. Each of them is sensorily attentive to the strangeness and the separateness of the “non-I” that the other represents for him. Such a dynamic process of jointness, represents healthy development from birth, paves the way to a sense of individuation and culminates to establish the valuable communication with others relating to their otherness, while preserving separateness and self integrity.

It is important to distinguish between jointness and symbiosis. Both may commence with the beginning of life; they may seem similar, and yet they are widely different experiences. In symbiosis, baby and mother behave and function as though they were "an omnipotent system - a dual unity within one common boundary" (Margaret Mahler, 1968, p. 201). Partners of symbiosis can be fully satisfied as long as there is no hint of separateness. Jointness, on the other hand, represents both the separateness of the two (or more) individuals and their joining in a third virtual space.

The development of this basic process (between baby and mother) in symbiosis depends on mother's inability to endure separateness while both of them are fully invested in each other. It is the mother who imprints on their encounter her need to contain herself with her baby in one unit and to prevent the encouragement of separateness in favor of the boundaries of their unity. Both partners will be motivated, through life, by a powerful need for merging and they will remain almost addicted to finding another object to merge with and attach their symbiotic needs, even at the expense of sacrificing their individuation, their true-self and their self-esteem. Such an encounter fosters only a dyadic relation where the "transitional virtual space" between them is missing.

Hence, symbiosis is a dyadic pathological process, even from the beginning of life that results in self fragility, narcissistic disturbances and in an immature personality; while jointness represents a triadic healthy development that depends on healthy narcissism and generates separation-individuation, communication and relationship.

See also
 Child development
 Healthy narcissism
 Interpersonal relationship
 Narcissism
 Object relations theory
 Rapprochement
 Shared earning/shared parenting marriage
 Transference focused psychotherapy

Papers and articles
  http://www.pep-web.org/
 Solan, Ronnie (1998) Narcissistic Fragility in the Process of Befriending the Unfamiliar. Psychoanal. Amer. J. Psycho-Anal., Vol. 58:(2)163-186. [https://web.archive.org/web/20030417141513/http://www.springerlink.com/]
 Solan, Ronnie (1998b). The Narcissitic  Vulnerability to Change in Object Relation.  In Psychoan. In Israel (Theoriebildung  und therapeutische Praxis). BlatteR Band 9. Vandenhoeck & Ruprecht Göttingen.
 Solan, Ronnie (1999). The  Interaction Between Self and Other: A Different Perspective on Narcissism. Psychoanal. Study of the Child, 54: 193-215.
 Solan, Ronnie (2007). Enigma of Childhood (in Hebrew). Modan Publishing House.
 Solan, Ronnie (2015) 'The Enigma of Childhood' - The Profound Impact of the First Years of Life on Adults as Couples and Parents. Karnac Books.

Psychoanalytic terminology
Attachment theory
Child development